Pratapaditya was a powerful Zamindar of Jashore lower Bengal. He was eulogized, in an ahistorical manner, by 20th century Bengali nationalists as a Hindu liberator from foreign (Islamic) rule.

Sources

History 
Three contemporary sources remain —

 Letters of Portuguese Jesuit priests.
Collated in Histoire des lndes Orientales by Father Du Jarric.
 Baharistan-i-Ghaibi
 Travelogues of Abdul Latif.

Background 
Pratapaditya's father Shrihari (or Shridhara), was an influential officer in the service of Daud Khan Karrani; he was appointed as the wazir to replace Ludi Khan. On the fall of Daud Khan at the hand of the Mughals in the Battle of Rajmahal, Shrihari fled to the marshes of Khulna, claimed independence, and assumed the title of "Maharaja Vikramaditya". Pratapaditya assumed power in 1584. His rule over Jashore saw multiple foreign powers — the Portuguese, the Arakanese, and the Mughals — competing for control of the Bengal delta, often entering into fragile alliances with local rulers.

His daughter, Vimala, married Raja Ramchandra Basu of Chandradwip. They had a son, Kirtinarayan Basu, who later converted to Islam.

Biography

Rise to power 
Tradition asserts that Pratapaditya had his uncle murdered c. 1598 - 1600, with support from the Portuguese, and declared his independence. In return, he would allow the Missionaries to settle in his territories; the first Church in Bengal would be opened at Chandecan in about 1600.

Conflict with Portuguese 
In 1605, Pratapaditya invited Dominique Carvalho — a Portuguese war-master — only to have him arrested. Du Jarric mentions the treachery to have stemmed from a secret treaty with Arakans to save his own territory; historian Aniruddha Ray speculates that pleasing the Mughals, who were on the ascendancy, might had been an additional factor. Carvalho's arrest incited local Afghans to loot and massacre the Portuguese the same night; even the local missionary church was attacked. The next day, Pratapaditya doubled down on the persecution; he destroyed Carvalho's fleet, arrested the surviving Portuguese, and confiscated all of their properties. After a summary trial, four were put to death and a ransom of eleven thousand rupees was fixed for the rest. However, the Portuguese refused to pay the ransom for weeks and in the meanwhile, local Hindus even raided the church suspecting the missionaries of fueling the Portuguese reluctance. Once the ransom was paid, Pratapaditya had both the Portuguese and the Missionaries leave Jashore permanently. However, by 1612 they were parts of Jashore army and must have entered into a truce sometime in-between.

Mughal Imperialism 
In 1609, Islam Khan was appointed as the Subehdar of Bengal. Pratap sent his son Sangramaditya to greet Khan, who was inducted into imperial service; it was suggested that Pratap follow suit. In 1609, Pratap met Khan with fifty thousand rupees and other presents, accepting Mughal vassalage and promising military assistance in subduing Musa Khan and other Zamindars in the region. The deals was struck at a time when the Mughals were fighting multiple forces in Bengal and in a desperate need for allies. By 1612, most of the rebel Zamindars were subdued and Mughal ascendancy in the region was established. However, that Pratap did not help the Mughals in their expeditions, Islam Khan took umbrage and decided to seize Jashore alongside adjacent Bakla. Pratapaditya requested for a pardon and dispatched 80 war-boats under Sangramaditya but in vain; Sangramaditya was captured, and the fleet destroyed.

This encounter led Pratapaditya to start preparing for the inevitable showdown. Udayaditya along with the majority of his force was sent away to take a defensive stance on the banks of one Salka river, north of the capital, where a fort was rapidly constructed: a well-equipped navy was put under the command of Khwaja Kamal while the infantry unit was put under Jamal Khan. Despite strategically sound warfare on Udayaditya's part, the actual face-off ended in a devastating defeat — he, alongside Jamal Khan, barely escaped to Jashore where the rear-guard was already being mounted. The Mughals continued in their advance and camped at Buranhatty, not far from the capital. Soon enough, Bakla fell. With Jashore being opened up from all sides, Paratapaditya left for the Mughal camp to offer his submission. However, for reasons unknown, he ditched the plan and the conflict continued. Pratapaditya took, what would be his last stand, about 5 miles north of his capital, in a makeshift fort. The defence hold for days before felling to a sudden attack, forcing him to retreat to Jashore and concede defeat.

Paratapaditya was treated with respect and taken as a war-prisoner to Dhaka, where Islam Khan had him imprisoned along with his sons. Whereas his sons were released soon, what happened to Pratapaditya is not known; his territory was distributed as jagirs.

In popular culture

1750–1850 
The earliest extant mention of Pratapaditya in vernacular literature is Annada Mangal, a mid-18th c. historical epic by Raygunakar Bharatchandra. Pratap was a hero, blessed by Kali but vanity and pride hastened his end. This theme would influence the first historical prose on the subject by Ramram Basu written Pratapaditya Charita. Drafted as a historical romance novel c. 1800, Basu claimed to be among the heirs of Pratapaditya and used family letters and a Persian manuscript among sources. Both of these works would influence the production of future literature on Pratapaditya; notably, it was caste that played a defining role in the rise and fall of Pratapaditya, and communalism was absent.

1850–1900 
In 1856, Harish Chandra Tarkalankar published The History of Raja Pratapaditya: "The Last King of Saugar lsland" , modernizing off Basu's novel. Soon, the British administrators would start taking a keen interest in local history and naturally, Pratapaditya.

In 1857, Smyth was the first colonial official to chronicle Pratapaditya in context of certain ruins in Sunderban. 11 years later, Rainey read a paper on Pratapaditya in The Asiatic Society: the contents were borrowed from Tarkalankar's work and portrayed Pratapaditya as a hero. The first critical evaluation came from Westland's Report of the District of Jashore (1874) — in the words of Ray, it "cut Pratap's heroism to size". The same year, were published, three pioneering essays by Blochman.

By mid-1870s, Pratapaditya was no longer an unanimous hero — the colonial administration was pushing back against panegyrics. Beveridge's report in 1876 noted him to be a "cruel monster" for murdering Carvalho. Falkner deemed him to be an adventurer, not worth more than a footnote.

Notes

References

History of Bengal
Rulers of Bengal
1611 deaths
1561 births
People from Jessore District